Lancebranlette is a mountain of Savoie, France and of Aosta Valley, Italy. It lies in the Mont Blanc Massif range. It has an elevation of 2,936 metres above sea level.

Mountains of the Alps
Mountains of Savoie
Mountains of Aosta Valley
France–Italy border
International mountains of Europe